Bretton, Derbyshire is a hamlet in Derbyshire, England. Set on a ridge with a panoramic view, it has few inhabitants but boasts a pub called the Barrel Inn, and the Bretton youth hostel.

References

External links
Peak District online webpage

Hamlets in Derbyshire
Towns and villages of the Peak District
Derbyshire Dales